Henry Dangar (1796 - 1861) was a surveyor and explorer of Australia in the early period of British colonisation. He became a successful pastoralist and businessman, and also served as a magistrate and politician. He was born on 18 November 1796 at St Neot, Cornwall, United Kingdom, and was the first of six brothers to emigrate as free settlers to New South Wales. From 1845 to 1851 Dangar was a Member of the New South Wales Legislative Council.

Soon after arrival in the Jessie on 2 April 1821 he was appointed assistant government surveyor under John Oxley, and employed in the counties of Camden and Argyle. He remained in this position until 1827, surveying among other places, the township of Newcastle. Cornish place names, scattered through the Hunter Region, mark Henry Dangar's surveys and record his deep affection for his birthplace. Mount Dangar, Dangarfield, Dangar Falls, and Dangarsleigh commemorate his name.

He received two grants of land for his services as a surveyor -  named 'Neotsfield' and  near Morpeth, known as 'Baroona'. He returned to England in 1828 leaving his estates in the hands of his brother William, and when he returned to Australia his new wife Grace Sibly accompanied him. After his return he was granted land at Kingdon Ponds, and in the Port Stephens area he completed survey work for the Australian Agricultural Company until 1833.

In 1847 Henry Dangar together with his brothers Richard and William began a meat canning factory at Honeysuckle Point, Newcastle. The Newcastle Meat Preserving Company had been established after a severe drought caused a decline in cattle and sheep prices. Although the business won awards at the Great Exhibition of 1851 in London, and exported their product to India and California, the company had ceased to operate by 1855.

Government surveyor and explorer
In 1822 Dangar was transferred to Newcastle to survey the Hunter Valley in preparation for free settlement. He prepared the plans of King's Town (Newcastle) and in the next two years measured and marked out village reserves, church lands and allocations for settlers along the lower branches of the Hunter River and as far north as Patrick's Plains. From 1824 he surveyed the road from Newcastle to Wallis Plains (Maitland), measuring reserves and grants and working steadily northwards until he reached the hitherto unsettled upper districts of the Hunter River, where he explored the present sites of Muswellbrook, Aberdeen and Scone. After crossing the Hunter River just to the north-west of the present site of Aberdeen, he discovered Dart Brook and Kingdon Ponds, two tributaries that flow from the north.

In October 1824 he set out on an expedition during which he discovered the confluence of the Goulburn and Hunter rivers, and then, following Dart Brook to its source, crossed the Liverpool Range to the plains beyond. He turned back when attacked by the Geaweagal clan of the Wanaruah people west of where the town of Murrurundi now stands. His report on the quality of land on the plains caused an immediate rush of applicants for land grants. On this journey he sighted a domed feature that he named Mt Cupola. It was renamed Mount Dangar by explorer Allan Cunningham, who became the first European to climb it the following year.

Dismissal after investigation into land appropriation

In May 1825 he was commissioned to select land for a number of settlers in the area. He subsequently allocated to himself and his brother William some land to which another believed he had prior claim. A board of enquiry found Dangar guilty of using his public position for private gain and he was dismissed from office on 31 March 1827. Governor Sir Ralph Darling recommended that he be dispossessed of the land under dispute and required to take his grant in some other district. He returned to England to appeal against this recommendation. John Oxley supported him in his appeal, but it was unsuccessful.

Surveyor for the Australian Agricultural Company
During the voyage to England Dangar wrote his Index and Directory to Map of the Country Bordering Upon the River Hunter, which was published in London in 1828. It demonstrated his skill as a cartographer and ability as a surveyor, and brought him to the immediate attention of the directors of the Australian Agricultural Company. He was offered, and accepted, an appointment as a surveyor to the company.
Accompanied by his wife Grace, whom he married at St Neot on 13 May 1828, and by their infant son, he returned in April 1830 to take up his new position at Port Stephens.

Dangar produced topographical and soil reports on the company's grants, and surveyed its  reserve north of the Manning River. His reports of this area were so unfavourable that he was sent to explore, as an alternative location, the Liverpool Plains districts originally recommended to the company by John Oxley. From the headwaters of the Manning River, he crossed the Great Dividing Range to the Liverpool Plains, and selected an extensive area of attractive land for the company's consideration. After some negotiation the company's claim to the land was accepted by the government, and in June 1833 he retired to his property, Neotsfield, near Singleton.

Pastoralist and businessman
Neotsfield had for some time been managed by Henry Dangar's brother William. It was a flourishing and highly developed farm.
These included:

 Gostwyck (near Uralla) 
 Paradise Creek 
 Bald Hills 
 Moonbi 
 Buleori 
 Karee 
 Myall Creek 

Along the Great North Road to Liverpool Plains he acquired town allotments and established inns and stores. At Newcastle he had boiling-down works and meat-preserving and tinning works, and in New Zealand he established a steam flour-mill near the wheat farms around Official Bay (Auckland).

Myall Creek Massacre
The Myall Creek Massacre took place in 1838 on property owned by Dangar.

Dangar advised two of the witnesses, George Anderson and William Hobbs, not to report the crime. Anderson was a convict assigned to Dangar, while Hobbs was a free man in Dangar's employ. Dangar spoke at the trial of how he had given Anderson 100 lashes. When Hobbs ignored Dangar's advice and alerted the local magistrate, Dangar terminated his service, but testified at the trial that the termination was not connected with Hobbs's actions.

Efforts to pervert the course of justice
During the trial of the accused men, Dangar exercised his power and influence in order to sway the outcome. Dangar and his fellow squatters had established a secret society, the "Black Association", in their fight against the Aborigines over land. In addition to Dangar, the group included wealthy landowner, businessman and part owner of The Sydney Herald, Robert Scott. As the court case began, the group acted as a defence fund.

In addition to funding the defence, The Black Association orchestrated and funded a smear campaign, particularly via The Sydney Herald, aimed at influencing public opinion on the case. At the first hearing, the group arranged for the erroneous arrest of a key witness, Hobbs, for debt. They also paid jurors not to testify, resulting on an empty jury box on one morning of the hearing. 

Following the second hearing (which resulted in seven of the accused being hanged), the remaining four accused were remanded until the next session to allow time for the main witness against them, an Aboriginal boy named Yintayintin or Davey, to be prepared in order to take a Bible oath. It has been claimed that according to the missionary, Lancelot Edward Threlkeld, Dangar had arranged for Davey "to be put out of the way", and he was never seen again; and with Davey unable to be located, the four were discharged in February 1839. However, Threlkeld made no such statement regarding Dangar. What Threlkeld actually wrote about Davey's whereabouts at the time was:" ... for Mr Arndell, who was here last week, states that on his recent return from the Gwyder he was informed by a Gentleman that Davey was put out of the way, but whether with his throat cut, or only hid, could not be ascertained”.Further, when the remaining four accused came before the Court on 14 February 1839, Attorney General Plunkett informed the Court:“ … [Davey] had been under the tuition of a competent person for two months, but it was now reported to [the Attorney General] that he was not so far instructed as to be a competent witness, and it was quite uncertain when he would be; and he [the Attorney General] did not think he should be doing his duty in risking public justice by prosecuting the case without his evidence.

…

I cannot proceed with the trial with any hope of success without [Davey’s] evidence … ”.In other words, according to Plunkett, in mid-February 1839 Davey was alive and “under tuition”, however, Plunkett could not proceed with the case against the remaining accused because of the uncertainty surrounding the time it would take to complete that tuition. It was for this reason that the accused were discharged.

Magistrate and politician
Dangar was a magistrate and member of the district council for a number of years. He devoted much time and energy to the agricultural and political advancement of the Hunter valley. He was nominated for the electoral district comprising the Counties of Hunter, Brisbane and Bligh in the first elective Legislative Council in 1843, but was beaten by William Dumaresq. In 1845 he was elected to the New South Wales Legislative Council as the member for the County of Northumberland. He remained a member of the council until 1851 when he retired from public life. He died in Sydney on 2 March 1861 and was buried locally in a family vault. A year later he was exhumed and moved to a new vault at Singleton.

References

External links
Henry Dangar, the Dangar Family and Dangar Park (Mayfield) History information session. The University of Newcastle, Australia
Timeline results for Henry Dangar - Google Search (pages from Australia)
Map of the River Hunter and its branches. National Library of Australia - Rare Maps Digitisation Project. Contributor: Henry Dangar
Myall Creek Massacre 10 June 1838 newagemultimedia.com Ngiyani Winangay Gamunga (We Remember Them)
 

Explorers of Australia
Australian pastoralists
Members of the New South Wales Legislative Council
Port Stephens Council
History of Newcastle, New South Wales
Maitland, New South Wales
Mid-Coast Council
1796 births
1861 deaths
Australian people of Cornish descent
British emigrants to Australia
19th-century Australian businesspeople
19th-century Australian politicians